Whidbey Island Station is a census-designated place (CDP) in Island County, Washington, United States. The population was 1,541 at the 2010 census. It is the primary location of Naval Air Station Whidbey Island. Prior to 2010 the CDP was known as Ault Field.

Geography
The CDP is located near the north end of Whidbey at  (48.324860, -122.664772). It is bordered to the south by the city of Oak Harbor and to the west by the Strait of Juan de Fuca.

Climate
This region experiences warm (but not hot) and dry summers, with no average monthly temperatures above 71.6 °F.  According to the Köppen Climate Classification system, Ault Field has a warm-summer Mediterranean climate, abbreviated "Csb" on climate maps.

Demographics
As of the census of 2000, there were 2,064 people, 306 households, and 291 families residing in the CDP. The population density was 299.9 people per square mile (115.8/km). There were 311 housing units at an average density of 45.2/sq mi (17.5/km). The racial makeup of the CDP was 65.99% White, 10.22% African American, 1.70% Native American, 10.76% Asian, 1.16% Pacific Islander, 5.81% from other races, and 4.36% from two or more races. Hispanic or Latino of any race were 11.19% of the population.

There were 306 households, out of which 67.3% had children under the age of 18 living with them, 82.0% were married couples living together, 11.1% had a female householder with no husband present, and 4.6% were non-families. 3.6% of all households were made up of individuals, and none had someone living alone who was 65 years of age or older. The average household size was 2.82 and the average family size was 2.86.

In the CDP, the population was spread out, with 14.1% under the age of 18, 56.2% from 18 to 24, 28.5% from 25 to 44, 1.0% from 45 to 64, and 0.2% who were 65 years of age or older. The median age was 22 years. For every 100 females, there were 216.6 males. For every 100 females age 18 and over, there were 244.9 males.

The median income for a household in the CDP was $24,406, and the median income for a family was $24,125. Males had a median income of $15,498 versus $14,792 for females. The per capita income for the CDP was $12,036. About 5.1% of families and 5.2% of the population were below the poverty line, including 4.6% of those under age 18 and none of those age 65 or over.

References

Census-designated places in Island County, Washington
Census-designated places in Washington (state)